The Heber Micropolitan Statistical Area, as defined by the United States Office of Management and Budget, is an area consisting of two counties in Utah. It is part of the Salt Lake City–Provo–Orem combined statistical area, along with the Salt Lake City metropolitan area, Ogden–Clearfield metropolitan area, and Provo–Orem metropolitan area.

Previously, Summit County was part of the separate Summit Park micropolitan area, and the Heber micropolitan area consisted of only Wasatch County. However, Summit County has now been absorbed into the Heber micropolitan area.

Counties
Summit
Wasatch

Communities
Charleston
Coalville
Daniel
Echo (unincorporated)
Francis
Heber City
Henefer
Hideout
Hoytsville (unincorporated)
Independence
Interlaken
Kamas
Marion (unincorporated)
Midway
Oakley
Park City
Peoa (unincorporated)
Samak (unincorporated)
Silver Summit (unincorporated)
Snyderville (unincorporated)
Summit Park (unincorporated)
Timber Lakes (unincorporated)
Wallsburg
Wanship (unincorporated)
Woodland (unincorporated)

See also
Utah census statistical areas

References

Summit County, Utah
Wasatch County, Utah
Micropolitan areas of Utah